Eliomys ( Hēlíomus) is a genus of rodent in the family Gliridae.

It contains the following extant species:
 Asian garden dormouse, Eliomys melanurus
 Maghreb garden dormouse, Eliomys munbyanus
 Garden dormouse, Eliomys quercinus 
The earliest records of the genus are known from the Late Miocene (Tortonian) of the Iberian Peninsula.

Fossil species assigned to Eliomys include:

 †Eliomys truci
 †Eliomys yevesi
 †Eliomys intermedius
 †Eliomys assimilis
 †Eliomys lafarguei
 †Eliomys reductus

References

 Reumer J.W.F. 2001. Gliridae (Mammalia, Rodentia) from the Zuurland boreholes near Rotterdam, the Netherlands. Deinsea 8: 41-47

 
Rodent genera
Taxa named by Johann Andreas Wagner
Taxonomy articles created by Polbot